"Feel Me" is a single by American rapper Tyga from his fifth studio album BitchImTheShit2. The song was released on January 1, 2017, by GOOD Music and Interscope Records. The hip hop song, which features American rapper and GOOD Music label-mate Kanye West, was produced by Sound M.O.B. and Kanye West.

Charts

Release history

References

2017 songs
Tyga songs
Kanye West songs
Songs written by Tyga
Songs written by Kanye West
Song recordings produced by Kanye West